George Summers (22 March 1882 – 14 June 1962) was a British cyclist. He competed in two events at the 1908 Summer Olympics.

References

External links
 

1882 births
1962 deaths
British male cyclists
Olympic cyclists of Great Britain
Cyclists at the 1908 Summer Olympics
Place of birth missing